The Ministry of Culture of Tunisia, established in 1961, is responsible for the government and general planning and running of cultural enterprises and pursuits in the country. Its headquarters are at Rue du 2-Mars 1934 in Tunis. The current Minister of Culture is Hayet Guettat. The ministry had a budget of 170,735 million (TND).

Ministers

References

Government ministries of Tunisia
1961 establishments in Tunisia